The Sun Belt Conference first sponsored football in 2001. This is a list of its annual standings since establishment.

Sun Belt Conference standings

References

Standings
Sun Belt Conference